Laurent Walthert (born 30 March 1984) is a Swiss former football goalkeeper.

References

External links
Neuchatel Xamax Profile 

1984 births
People from Neuchâtel
Sportspeople from the canton of Neuchâtel
Living people
Association football goalkeepers
Swiss men's footballers
Neuchâtel Xamax FCS players
FC Meyrin players
FC La Chaux-de-Fonds players
FC Biel-Bienne players
Swiss Super League players
Swiss Challenge League players
Swiss 1. Liga (football) players